Haluk Türkeri (born 7 November 1986) is a Turkish football forward who plays for Adıyaman 1954 SK.

References

External links
 
 

1986 births
Living people
German people of Turkish descent
Turkish footballers
Turkish expatriate footballers
VfL Bochum players
VfL Bochum II players
Karlsruher SC II players
Rot-Weiss Essen players
SV Elversberg players
SV Darmstadt 98 players
Denizlispor footballers
Samsunspor footballers
Boluspor footballers
Aydınspor footballers
Menemenspor footballers
Bandırmaspor footballers
Kahramanmaraşspor footballers
TFF First League players
TFF Second League players
Regionalliga players
Turkey youth international footballers
Association football forwards